Huckaby is an unincorporated community in Polk County, in the U.S. state of Missouri.

History
A post office called Huckaby was established in 1905, and remained in operation until 1915. The community has the name of the local Huckaby family.

References

Unincorporated communities in Polk County, Missouri
Unincorporated communities in Missouri